Mamool (foaled 1999 in Ireland) is a Thoroughbred racehorse who raced for five years from 2001 through 2005.
Bred and raced by the operations of Sheikh Mohammed bin Rashid Al Maktoum of Dubai, among Mamool's wins were the Queen's Vase and the Yorkshire Cup in England in the Group Ones Grosser Preis von Baden and Preis von Europa in Germany.

References
 Mamool's pedigree and partial racing stats

1999 racehorse births
Thoroughbred family 4-r
Racehorses bred in Ireland
Racehorses trained in the United Kingdom